The Silent Battle (French: La bataille silencieuse) is a 1937 French thriller film directed by Pierre Billon and starring Käthe von Nagy, Pierre Fresnay and Michel Simon. The film's sets were designed by the art director Aimé Bazin. It was remade as a British film of the same title in 1939.

Synopsis
A journalist on the trail of a group of arms smugglers becomes aware of an impending attack on the Orient Express.

Cast
 Käthe von Nagy as Draguicha 
 Pierre Fresnay as Bordier 
 Michel Simon as Sauvin 
 Abel Tarride as Bartoff 
 Renée Corciade as L'américaine
 Pierre Sergeol  as Fernando
 Geno Ferny as Ernest
 Ernest Ferny as Méricant 
 Albert Gercourt  as Sanneman
 Pierre Huchet  as Le sécretaire
 André Alerme as Le directeur du journal

References

Bibliography 
 Dayna Oscherwitz & MaryEllen Higgins. The A to Z of French Cinema. Scarecrow Press, 2009.

External links 
 

1937 films
French thriller films
1930s thriller films
1930s French-language films
Films directed by Pierre Billon
Pathé films
French black-and-white films
1930s French films